Prince Sanggye or Crown Prince Wanpung (January 21, 1769 - November 20, 1786) was a Korean prince, an adopted son of Jeongjo of Joseon and biological child of Prince Euneon. His first name was Yi Jun (이준 李濬), his changed name was Yi Dam (이담 李湛),  and his other name was Yi Shik (이식 李湜). His posthumous epithet is unknown.

Life 
Prince Sanggye was born as Yi Jun, on January 21, 1769, in Hanseong. He was the son of Prince Euneon and his wife, Princess Consort Sangsan of the Jincheon Song clan, a daughter of Song Rak-hyu. His father was the son of Crown Prince Sado and his great-grandfather was Yeongjo of Joseon. During his early childhood, he was adopted by Hong Guk-yeong, the fourth cousin-once-removed of Lady Hyegyeong, as the son of his sister, Royal Noble Consort Won of the Pungsan Hong clan, and King Jeongjo.

At the time, Ku Seon-bok and other Joseon noblemen supported Yi Jun as heir to the throne, but as King Jeongjo was in his mid-20s and could still be expected to produce a child, Kim Jong-su, along with many of Jeongjo's ministers, who were enemies of Hong Guk-yeong, demanded his and Crown Prince Wanpung's removal.

On May 7, 1779, Lady Hong Won-bin of Pungsan suddenly died and the King's ministers repeatedly accused Hong Guk-yeong and the Crown Prince.

On September 26, 1779, Hong Guk-yeong was expelled from power and jailed. Crown Prince Wanpung was dethroned and removed from the peerage. His title was changed from Wanpung to Sanggye and his name was also changed from Yi Jun to Yi Dam, but the King's retainers continued their attacks.

On January 21, 1784, he was married to Lady Shin of Pyeongsan, a daughter of Shin Oh.

On November 20, 1786, Prince Sanggye suddenly died and it's suspected to have been poisoned. Some accused Hong Guk-yeong or his biological father, Prince Euneon, and others accused some of King Jeongjo's retainers. After his death, he was buried at Yeonhul Castle, near modern Sinchon Station and Yonsei University. His funeral was personally arranged by his adoptive father, Jeongjo of Joseon.

Prince Sanggye was not reinstated for many years. In 1801, his mother, Princess Consort Sangsan, and his wife, Princess Consort Shin, were executed for their belief in Catholicism (Neo-Confucianism was the state religion of the Joseon Dynasty).

He was eventually amnestied and rehabilitated on June 17, 1849, by King Cheoljong, who was his half-nephew.

Family
Father: 
Biological: Prince Euneon (29 May 1754 - 30 June 1801) (은언군)
Grandfather: Jangjo of Joseon (13 February 1735 - 12 July 1762) (조선 장조)
Grandmother: Royal Noble Consort Suk of the Buan Im clan (? - 1773) (숙빈 임씨)
Adoptive: Jeongjo of Joseon (28 October 1752 - 18 August 1800) (조선 정조왕)
Grandfather: Jangjo of Joseon (13 February 1735 - 12 July 1762) (조선 장조)
Grandmother: Queen Heongyeong of the Pungsan Hong clan (6 August 1735 - 13 January 1816) (헌경왕후 홍씨)
Mother: 
Biological: Princess Consort Sangsan of the Jincheon Song clan (15 October 1753 - 17 March 1801) (상산군부인 송씨)
Grandfather: Song Nak-hyu (송낙휴)
Grandmother: Lady Gu of the Neungseong Gu clan (부인 능성 구씨)
Adoptive: Royal Noble Consort Won of the Pungsan Hong clan (27 May 1766 - 7 May 1779) (원빈 홍씨)
Grandfather: Hong Nak-chun (홍낙춘)
Grandmother: Lady Yi of the Ubong Yi clan (부인 우봉 이씨)
Sibling(s):
Younger brother: Yi Chang-sun (이창순)
Younger brother: Yi Chang-deok (이창덕)
Younger brother: Yi Dang, Prince Punggye (1783 - 1826) (이당 풍계군)
Younger sister: Lady Yi of the Jeonju Yi clan (? - 1872) (이씨)
Brother-in-law: Han Gak-sin (한각신)
Consorts and their Respective Issue(s):
Princess Consort Shin of the Pyeongsan Shin clan (13 June 1769 - 17 March 1801) (평산군부인 평산 신씨)
Adopted son: Yi Hui, Prince Ikpyeong (1824 - 1863) (이희 익평군), son of his younger full-brother Yi Dang, Prince Punggye
Unknown concubine – a palace maid (궁인)
Stillborn son

Ancestry

See also 
 Yi Dang
 Jeongjo of Joseon
 Crown prince Sado
 Queen Jeongsun

References

Site link 
 Crown Prince Sangkye 
 顯祿大夫益平君諡狀

Heirs apparent who never acceded
18th-century Korean people
1769 births
1786 deaths
House of Yi
Korean princes
Korean murderers